William or Bill Mack may refer to:

 William Mack (Ontario politician) (1828–1897), Ontario businessman and political figure
 William L. Mack (1924–2009), provincial level politician from Alberta, Canada
 William Mack (judge) (1904–1979), barrister and judge in Queensland, Australia
 William P. Mack (1915–2003), vice admiral in the United States Navy
 William B. Mack (1872–1955), American stage and film actor
 Bill Mack (songwriter) (1932–2020), American country music singer, songwriter, and radio host
 Bill Mack (sculptor) (born 1944), American sculptor and painter
 Bill Mack (baseball) (1885–1971), pitcher in Major League Baseball
 Red Mack (1937–2021), American football player